The Fire is a 1988 album by Heatwave and their last album of new material to date.  Released only in the United Kingdom on the Soul City label (not to be confused with the Johnny Rivers-owned label of the same name), it was never available in the US, except as an import.  Singer Keith Wilder is the only original member involved on this album, although guitarist Billy Jones (who also produced the album) had begun working with the band in the late 1970s; all others featured on this album were new members.  It is also the first album from them not to feature a song written by Rod Temperton.

Two singles, "Straight from the Heart" and "Who Dat?!" were released from the album.

Track listing

Personnel
Heatwave
Keith Wilder – lead and backing vocals
Billy Jones – guitars, lead and backing vocals, bass, keyboards, drum programming
Josh Phillips – keyboards, synth programming
Dave Williamson – bass
Ivan T. "Muscle" Houpe – drums, percussion, drum programming
Additional musicians
Neil Andrews - additional keyboards and synthesizer programming on "Snap", "Who's Lonely Now" and "Who Dat?!"
Vince Andrews - saxophone solo on "Who's Lonely Now"

External links
The Fire on Discogs

Heatwave (band) albums
1988 albums